Henrik Jacobsen Kleven (born 28 April 1971) is a Danish economist who is currently a Professor of Economics and Public Affairs at Princeton University. He is also Co-Editor of the American Economic Review. His research lies inside the domain of Public Economics and Inequality, in particular questions about tax policy and welfare programs. He combines economic theory and empirical evidence to show ways of designing more effective public policies. His work has had policy impact in both developed and developing countries.

Career 

Kleven obtained his M.Sc. in economics from the University of Copenhagen in 2001 and received his Ph.D. in economics from the same institution in 2003. His thesis adviser was Professor Peter Birch Sørensen, and the title of his thesis was Taxation, Time Allocation, and Economic Efficiency. Following his Ph.D., he worked first as an assistant professor and then as an associate professor at University of Copenhagen before moving to the London School of Economics (LSE) in 2007. He became a full professor at the LSE in 2013. Since July 2017, he has been a professor in the Department of Economics and Woodrow Wilson School at Princeton University.

Research 

Kleven's research combines economic theory and empirical evidence (often using large administrative datasets) to study the impact and design of public policies. He has authored or co-authored numerous scientific publications, including articles in the journals American Economic Review, Econometrica, Journal of Political Economy, Quarterly Journal of Economics and Review of Economic Studies. Among his co-authors are the Danish public finance economists Peter Birch Sørensen and Claus Thustrup Kreiner as well as Emmanuel Saez, Gabriel Zucman, Camille Landais, Wojciech Kopczuk, Joel Slemrod, and Jonathan Gruber.

A number of Kleven's contributions study behavioral responses to tax and transfer policies. This includes studies of the impact of such policies on labor supply, taxable income, tax evasion, and international migration. Much of his work leverages large-scale administrative data from European countries (such as Denmark), but he has also studied policies in developing countries and in the United States. In a recent article, Kleven studies the Earned Income Tax Credit (EITC) program in the United States, arguing that the impact of this program on the labor force participation of single mothers has been smaller than the program is typically credited for. He argues that the historical increase in labor force participation among single mothers in the 1990s was driven primarily by welfare reform and a strong macro economy rather than by the EITC.

One of Kleven's more easily accessible contributions is "How can Scandinavians tax so much?", published in the Journal of Economic Perspectives in 2014. Here he attempts to answer a question often asked by Americans visiting Denmark and the other Scandinavian countries: How can the Scandinavian countries have such high levels of prosperity and economic efficiency, while at the same time imposing high tax rates and offering generous welfare programs that reduce economic incentives? Kleven points to three facts that make the distortions of the Danish tax and transfer system relatively small: the widespread use of third-party information reporting (ensuring a low level of tax evasion), broad tax bases with few exemptions and deductions (ensuring a low level of tax avoidance), and strong subsidization of goods that are complementary to working (ensuring a high level of labor force participation). He also hypothesizes that social and cultural norms may play a role, specifically that high levels of trust and social coherence in Scandinavia make high taxes more acceptable and help ensure low tax avoidance.

In recent years, Kleven has produced a number of articles on gender inequality in the labor market. This work has developed new ways of estimating the so-called child penalty. This term refers to the negative impact of having children on the labor market outcomes (such as labor supply or earnings) of women relative to men. Together with co-authors, he shows that child penalties are very large and persistent in a range of countries and that they account for most the remaining gender inequality. This implies that efforts to increase gender equality should focus on the division of child care responsibilities in families with children. His paper "Children and Gender Inequality: Evidence from Denmark" (published in the American Economic Journal: Applied Economics in 2019) develops the methodology and received the AEJ Best Paper Award in 2020. In other papers, Kleven studies the underlying factors that might be responsible for the large child penalties on women such as biology, comparative advantage, public policies, social norms and culture. He argues that norms and culture are the most likely drivers of the variation in child penalties observed across countries and over time.

Other professional activities 

Kleven is Co-Editor of the American Economic Review, the premier journal of the American Economic Association. Previously he was Chief Editor of the Journal of Public Economics. He is a Research Associate of the National Bureau of Economic Research and of the Centre for Economic Policy Research, whose Public Economics Program he directed from 2014 to 2017.

References

External links 
Henrik Kleven's professional homepage

Living people
University of Copenhagen alumni
Princeton University faculty
21st-century  Danish  economists
1971 births